A list of films produced in Italy in 1918 (see 1918 in film):

External links
 Italian films of 1918 at the Internet Movie Database

Italian
1918
Films